Polytremis eltola, the yellow spot swift, is a species of skipper butterfly found in the Indomalayan realm.

Description

Found in Darjeeling, Kumaon (Doherty); Cachar (Wood-Mason and de Niceville); Kangra, N.-W. Himalayas (Moore) Sikkim (de Niceville; Elwes) and (P. e. corbeti Evans, 1937) the Malay Peninsula.

References

Hesperiinae
Butterflies of Asia
Butterflies of Indochina
Butterflies described in 1869
Taxa named by William Chapman Hewitson